The Great Edinburgh International Cross Country was an annual cross country running competition that took place every January in Edinburgh, Scotland. It was one of the competitions in the Great Run series of athletics events and was held alongside the Great Winter Run 5 kilometres mass participation race. The event was first held in Edinburgh in 2005 after the city was awarded the Great North Cross Country which relocated from Durham. The Great Edinburgh International Cross Country featured three professional races: the men's 8 km race, the women's 6 km race, and the 4x1km relay. It was an IAAF permit meeting, which means that performances could be used to qualify for the annual IAAF World Cross Country Championships. It was announced on the BBC coverage of the 2018 event that that year's edition would be its last. The event was replaced by the Great Stirling Cross Country in nearby Stirling.

The grassy, occasionally muddy, course in Holyrood Park ran in a circular, clockwise pattern. The same venue was used to host the 2003 European Cross Country Championships and the 2008 IAAF World Cross Country Championships. It had relatively difficult routes in the past, with runners twice having to climb and descend Haggis Knowe (a steep hill) in 2009. The meeting attracted cross country athletes of the highest calibre, with past competitors including six-time World Champion Kenenisa Bekele, Gebregziabher Gebremariam, Tirunesh Dibaba and Eliud Kipchoge.

The meeting was broadcast by the BBC annually, and received sponsorship from VisitScotland (in 2006) Bupa (from 2007 to 2014) and PureGym in 2016.

A new team competition format was introduced for the 2011 event. The four teams assembled were Great Britain, Europe, the United States and Great Britain Under-23s. Britain's Mo Farah won the race but the Europeans, featuring all the reigning European Cross medallists, won the overall team challenge.

Garrett Heath had three consecutive wins in the men's race from 2014 to 2016, two on the short course and one on the long.

Past winners

All information taken from official website.

References

External links

Official website

Cross country running competitions
Athletics competitions in Scotland
Recurring sporting events established in 2005
2005 establishments in Scotland
Annual sporting events in the United Kingdom
Annual events in Edinburgh
Cross country running in the United Kingdom
Winter events in Scotland